Bahrain competed at the 1988 Summer Paralympics in Seoul, South Korea. 11 competitors from Bahrain won 3 medals including 1 gold, 1 silver and 1 bronze and finished 37th in the medal table.

See also 
 Bahrain at the Paralympics
 Bahrain at the 1988 Summer Olympics

References 

Nations at the 1988 Summer Paralympics
1988
Summer Paralympics